An industry standard is a technical standard used in technical contexts throughout an industry. It may also refer to:
 Industry Standard Architecture, the 16-bit internal bus of IBM Personal Computer/AT
 Industry Standard Coding Identification, a standard created to identify commercials that aired on U.S. TV
 The Industry Standard, a news website and former magazine

Music
 Industry Standard, a 1982 album by the Dregs
 Industry Standard, a UK garage duo (Clayton Mitchell and Dave Deller) known for the 1997 song "Vol. 1 (What You Want What You Need)"
 Industry Standard, an alias used by Orbital in 1992 for the single "Rave On"; after this, Orbital would go on to use the phrase "industry standard" to mean a radio edit of a song

See also
 Standard (disambiguation)